Iain David Carr (born 25 March 1977) is a former English cricketer.  Carr was a right-handed batsman who bowled right-arm fast-medium.  He was born in Newcastle-under-Lyme, Staffordshire.

Carr made his debut for Staffordshire in the 1999 MCCA Knockout Trophy against the Leicestershire Cricket Board.  Carr played Minor counties cricket for Staffordshire from 1999 to 2006, which included 9 Minor Counties Championship matches and 10 MCCA Knockout Trophy matches.  In 2000, he made his List A debut against the Somerset Cricket Board in the 1st round of the NatWest Trophy.  He played a further List A match against Devon in the following round.  In his 2 List A matches, he took 5 wickets at an average of 17.00, with best figures of 3/34.

References

Carr broke the North Staffordshire and South Cheshire Premier League batting record in 2003, scoring 215 versus Barlaston, the record still stands as of 2023.
He also achieved three 9 wicket hauls in the same league whilst representing Moddershall.

External links
Iain Carr at ESPNcricinfo
Iain Carr at CricketArchive

1977 births
Living people
Sportspeople from Newcastle-under-Lyme
English cricketers
Staffordshire cricketers